Noha is a form of Arabic poetry, a lament for the death of Husayn ibn Ali in the Battle of Karbala.

Noha or NOHA may also refer to:

Northern Ontario Hockey Association, ice hockey organisation in Canada
NOHA (academic organisation), Network on Humanitarian Action, international group of universities 
Nominal Ocular Hazard Area in laser safety 
N-hydroxy-L-arginine (NOHA)

People with the surname 
Mike Noha U.S. soccer forward

People with the given name
Noha Yossry (1992) Egyptian table tennis player
Noha Waibsnaider US businesswoman
Noha Radwan assistant professor of Arabic and comparative literature at the University of California, Davis
Noha Eid (1987) Egyptian female volleyball player
Noha Abd Rabo (1987) Egyptian taekwondo fighter

See also